Simon F. Green (born 1959) is an astronomer. He is a Senior Lecturer in Planetary and Space Science at the Open University. He specializes in the study of asteroids and trans-Neptunian objects, and for a long time worked with the IRAS satellite to detect fast moving objects. In 1983, along with John K. Davies, he discovered the Apollo asteroid 3200 Phaethon.

Asteroid 9831 Simongreen is named after him.

References
PSSRI staff profile

Notes

1959 births
Living people
Academics of the Open University
21st-century British astronomers
Planetary scientists
20th-century British astronomers